Cookanamuck is a small uninhabited island (isthmus) in County Westmeath, Ireland. It is located near Friars Island in Lough Ree. It is in the civil parish of St. Mary's.

See also
 Creaghduff

References 

Townlands of County Westmeath